Acraea parei is a butterfly in the family Nymphalidae. It is found in Zimbabwe, Malawi and Zambia. The habitat consists of montane grassland.

Adults have been recorded in April, October, November and December.

Subspecies
Acraea parei parei (Zimbabwe: Chimanimani Mountains)
Acraea parei orangica (Henning & Henning, 1996) (the Nyika Plateau in Malawi and Zambia)

Taxonomy
It is a member of the Acraea rahira species group-   but see also Pierre & Bernaud, 2014

References

External links

Images representing  Acraea parei orangica at Bold.

Butterflies described in 1996
parei